The Stadttheater Bremerhaven (Bremerhaven municipal theatre) is a theatre in Bremerhaven, Germany. Founded in 1867, it serves three genres: opera and other musical theatre, spoken plays, and dance. A theatre built on the present site in 1911 was largely destroyed in World War II; a new house was built in 1952 which incorporated the surviving Jugendstil facade. The smaller Bürgerhaus Lehe, which served as a home before the rebuilding, is currently used as a venue for chamber pieces.

Literature 

 Fritz Ernst: Das Bremerhavener Theater – ein Beitrag zu seiner Geschichte von den Anfängen bis zur Wiedererrichtung nach dem 2. Weltkrieg. Stadtarchiv Bremerhaven. Ditzen, Bremerhaven 1981
 Hans-E. Happel: Gesetzt den Fall, wir schliessen das Theater – zur Nachkriegsgeschichte des Stadttheaters Bremerhaven 1945–1988. Nordwestdeutscher Verlag, Bremerhaven 1993, .
 Stadttheater Bremerhaven: 100 Jahre  Stadttheater Bremerhaven – Eine Festschrift. Bremerhaven 1967.
 Stadttheater Bremerhaven: 100 Jahre Oper am Stadttheater Bremerhaven – eine Dokumentation. Bremerhaven 1972.
 Jürgen Dieter Waidelich: 100 Jahre Stadttheater Bremerhaven – eine Festschrift, Nordwestdeutscher Verlag, Bremerhaven 1967.
 Manfred Ernst, Kai Kähler, Wolfgang Denker, Dirk Böttger, Anne Stürzer: Hundert Jahre Stadttheater Bremerhaven. ed.: Stadttheater Bremerhaven; NW-Verlag, Bremerhaven 2011, 
 Antje Hansen: Oskar Kaufmann – ein Theaterarchitekt zwischen Tradition und Moderne. Gebr. Mann Verlag, Berlin 2001,  (Dissertation at the FU Berlin)
 Festschrift zur Eröffnung des Stadttheaters Bremerhaven Ostern 1952. Ditzen, Bremerhaven 1952.
 Volker Heigenmooser and Heiko Sandelmann: Bremerhaven – einig fürs Theater. Die Sanierung des Stadttheaters Bremerhaven 1997–2000. Städtische Grundstücksgesellschaft Bremerhaven, Wirtschaftsverlag NW, Bremerhaven 2000, .

External links 

 Offizielle Homepage des Stadttheaters Bremerhaven (dort speziell zur Geschichte des Stadttheaters )
 
 Stadttheater Bremerhaven balletbase.com
 Stadttheater Bremerhaven deu.archinform.net
 Skizzen und Bauzeichnungen zum Stadttheater Bremerhaven by Gerhard Graubner (Archive of Architekturmuseum der Technischen Universität Berlin)

Theatre in Germany